Lemons is the second album by American garage rock singer-songwriter Ty Segall. The album was released by Goner Records July 14, 2009 on CD/LP. Lemons was Segall's first album on Goner Records, and his first release to be issued on CD as well as other formats. The song "Cents" was Segall's first official music video. It is the only video released from the album.

Track listing
All songs by Ty Segall, except where noted.

Cover art
The cover art by Denée Petracek features a blurry photograph of Segall shaking his head horizontally. Petracek was also credited for the cover art of Melted and Sleeper.

Credits
Ty Segall: Engineering, recording, guitar, vocals, drums.
Jigmae Baer: Drums on Johnny.
Matthew Hartman: Recording.
Mike McHugh: Engineering.
Denée Petracek: Cover photo.

References

Ty Segall albums
2009 albums